Juan Benito Ostoic Ostojic (21 March 1931 – 25 June 2020), known as Juan Ostoic, was a Chilean basketball player. He competed in the men's tournament at the 1952 Summer Olympics and the 1956 Summer Olympics.

After his playing career, Ostoic became a coach, leading Unión Española to multiple Chilean titles. He also served as an assistant for the Chilean national basketball team.

Ostoic also created crossword puzzles for the La Tercera newspaper since 1981 under the pseudonym "Jota O".

References

External links
 

1931 births
2020 deaths
Chilean men's basketball players
1954 FIBA World Championship players
Olympic basketball players of Chile
Basketball players at the 1952 Summer Olympics
Basketball players at the 1956 Summer Olympics
Crossword compilers
1950 FIBA World Championship players